The 2008 Black-Eyed Susan Stakes was the 84th running of the Black-Eyed Susan Stakes. The race took place in Baltimore, Maryland on May 16, 2008, and was televised in the United States on the Bravo TV network owned by NBC. Ridden by jockey Channing Hill, Sweet Vendetta, won the race by one and one half lengths over runner-up Shes All Eltish. Approximate post time on the evening before the Preakness Stakes was 5:50 p.m. Eastern Time and the race was run for a purse of $150,000. The race was run over a fast track in a final time of 1:49.60. The Maryland Jockey Club reported total attendance of 18,407.

Payout 

The 84th Black-Eyed Susan Stakes Payout Schedule

$2 Exacta:  (2–8) paid   $85.80

$2 Trifecta:  (2–8–6) paid   $514.20

$1 Superfecta:  (2–8–6–4) paid   $904.70

The full chart 

 Winning Breeder: David Cassidy; (VA)  
 Final Time: 1:49.60
 Track Condition: Fast
 Total Attendance: 18,407

See also 
 2008 Preakness Stakes
 Black-Eyed Susan Stakes Stakes "top three finishers" and # of starters

References

External links 
 Official Black-Eyed Susan Stakes website
 Official Preakness website

2008 in horse racing
2008 in American sports
2008 in sports in Maryland
Black-Eyed Susan Stakes
Horse races in Maryland